Regatta at Molesey near Hampton Court is an 1874 painting by Alfred Sisley, now in the Musée d'Orsay, to which it was allocated in 1986. It was left to the French state by the painter and collector Gustave Caillebotte in 1894, and previously hung in the Musée du Luxembourg (1896-1929), the main building at the Louvre (1929-1947), and the Louvre's galerie du Jeu de Paume (1947-1986).

The work shows the Molesey Regatta, begun by an amateur sportsman in 1873 and still in existence. Sisley produced it during a four-month stay in England, funded and accompanied by his patron the art collector Jean-Baptiste Faure. Paradoxically, in usually cloudier England, Sisley's paintings became brighter and more festive.

References

External links

Paintings by Alfred Sisley
1874 paintings
Paintings in the collection of the Musée d'Orsay
Flags in art
Maritime paintings
Sports paintings